Shiawase ni tsuite Honki Dashite Kangaete Mita (幸せについて本気出して考えてみた) (English: I Tried to Think About How Really Happy) is the eighth single released by the Japanese pop-rock band Porno Graffitti. It was released on March 6, 2002. In the single work is the longest title.

Track listing

References

2002 singles
Porno Graffitti songs
2002 songs
SME Records singles